RPC may refer to:

Science and technology
 Rational polynomial coefficient
 Reactive Plastic Curtain, a carbon-dioxide-absorbing device used in some rebreather breathing sets
 Regional Playback Control, a regional lockout technology for DVDs
 Remote procedure call, an inter-process communication technique in networked computing 
 Open Network Computing Remote Procedure Call, IETF RPC, aka "Sun RPC"
 DCE/RPC, for Distributed Computing Environment by Open Software Foundation
 JSON-RPC, a "JSON encoded" variant
 XML-RPC, an "XML encoded" variant
 Resistive plate chamber, a simple type of particle detector used in experimental particle physics
 Reversed-phase chromatography, a chemistry technique
 Acorn Risc PC
 Rocket Pod Container, the interchangeable containers used to transport and launch missiles for use with the M270 Multiple Launch Rocket System
 Rotary phase converter, an electrical machine that converts power from one polyphase system (including frequency) to another, converting through rotary motion.

Organizations
 RPC Group, UK packaging company
 Recorded Picture Company, a British film-production company
 Reformed Presbyterian Church (disambiguation), denominations following a Presbyterian form of Christianity
 Regent's Park College, a permanent private hall of Oxford University
 RPC Fort (Research and Production Company Fort), a Ukrainian weapons manufacturer
 Research Policy Council, the executive management team for the Congressional Research Service, a division of the Library of Congress
 Royal Parks Constabulary, a police force which patrolled the eight Royal Parks of London and a number of other locations in London, 1974-2004
 RPC, Inc., a North American oil services business

Law and politics
 Reports of Patent, Design and Trademark Cases, a case-law journal published by the Oxford University Press on behalf of the UK Intellectual Property Office
 Revolutionary Policy Committee, a faction within UK Independent Labour Party during the 1930s
 Reynolds Porter Chamberlain, a law firm based in London
 Revised Penal Code of the Philippines
 Rules of Professional Conduct, relating to U.S. lawyers' ethical rules, see American Bar Association Model Rules of Professional Conduct

Sports
 Russian Paralympic Committee
 RPC, the IPC code used for Russian Olympic Committee athletes:
 Russian Paralympic Committee athletes at the 2020 Summer Paralympics
 Russian Paralympic Committee athletes at the 2022 Winter Paralympics

Other uses
 Recurrent pyogenic cholangitis, a medical condition
 Red Paraguaya de Comunicación, a TV operator in Paraguay
 Rei Publicae Constituendae, part of the title of the members of the second triumvirate, appearing on Roman coins
 République populaire de Chine, República popular China, República popular da China, the French, Spanish and Portuguese names for the People's Republic of China
 RPC, a Panamanian national television network

See also